The UD Quon (kana:UD・クオン) is a heavy-duty commercial vehicle produced by the Japanese manufacturer UD Trucks, a former division of AB Volvo (now Isuzu).
Quon was originally developed by Nissan Diesel Corporation with the world first implementation of Selective catalytic reduction (SCR) system to automobile.

History 
First Generation (2004-2017)
Quon was released on November 18, 2004 in Japan, as the successor of BigThumb.
It is said that it was named for the term "" with the same pronunciation, meaning "timeline forever" or "permanent".
Not only equipped with SCR system, Quon was the world's first truck which has SRS knee airbag as standard equipment.

Second generation (2017- )
The second generation Quon was released in 2017. It has improved drivability with a new 11-litre GH11 (based on Volvo D11) and 8-litre GH8 (based on Volvo D8) diesel engine.

Awards 
 2005:  (Techinology Development Award) from JSAE

Line up 
CK 4x2
CD 6x2R
CV 6x2F
CW 6x4
CX 6x4 (low floor variant)
CG 8x4
CF 4x4
CZ 6x6
GK 4x2 
GW 6x4
CV-P 6x2
CW-P 6x4

Engine 
Quon engines using AdBlue Urea Selective Catalytic Reduction technology.

MD92-TB Straight-6 OHC 9.203 cc 340HP
MD92-TC Straight-6 OHC          370HP
GH8 Straight-6 OHC 7.700cc 280HP
GH11-TA Straight-6 OHC 10.836 cc 350HP
GH11-TB Straight-6 OHC           380HP
GH11-TC Straight-6 OHC           410HP
GE13-TB Straight-6 OHC 13.074 cc 380HP
GE13-TC Straight-6 OHC           410HP
GE13-TD Straight-6 OHC           440HP
GE13-TF Straight-6 OHC           520HP

See also
UD
Selective catalytic reduction (SCR)

External links

official

References

Cab over vehicles
Quon
UD trucks
Vehicles introduced in 2004